The RACV Gold Coast Challenge was a golf tournament played in Australia. It was one of the leading tournaments on the ALPG Tour and was co-sanctioned by the Ladies European Tour (LET) since 2001. Between 1997 and 2000 it was an event on the LPGA Tour. It has been played at the RACV Royal Pines Resort in Benowa, Queensland, a suburb of Gold Coast since 1992.

In 2007 the Masters was the richest women's golf tournament in Australia, with a prize fund of A$800,000. Although the 2008 prize fund dropped to A$600,000, the tournament remained the richest in Australia. The 144 strong 2015 field consisted of 50 ALPG players, 50 LET players, 10 LPGA of Korea Tour players, 5 China Ladies Professional Golf Association players, 3 leading players from the Women's World Golf Rankings and sponsor's invitees.

The tournament was founded in 1990 as a 54-hole stroke play event, and was originally called the Australian Ladies Masters. It expanded to 72 holes in 1994. Australia's most successful women golfer Karrie Webb won the event a record eight times.

Tournament winners

Contested over 54 holes from 1990 through 1993, reduced to 54 holes due to adverse weather in 2008, and contested over 54 holes in 2017.

Multiple winners
Five players won this tournament more than once.

8 wins
Karrie Webb: 1998, 1999, 2000, 2001, 2005, 2007, 2010, 2013
3 wins
Annika Sörenstam: 1995, 2002, 2004
Laura Davies: 1993, 1994, 2003
2 wins
Jane Crafter: 1992, 1996
Jane Geddes: 1990, 1991

References

External links

Coverage on the ALPG Tour's official site
Coverage on the Ladies European Tour's official site

Former Ladies European Tour events
ALPG Tour events
Former LPGA Tour events
Golf tournaments in Australia
Sports competitions on the Gold Coast, Queensland
Recurring sporting events established in 1990
Recurring sporting events disestablished in 2017
1990 establishments in Australia
2017 disestablishments in Australia